Cyclonic Storm Akash (JTWC designation: 01B) was the first named tropical cyclone of the 2007 North Indian Ocean cyclone season. Warned by both India Meteorological Department (IMD) and Joint Typhoon Warning Center (JTWC), it formed from an area of disturbed weather on the Bay of Bengal on May 12, and gradually organized as it drifted northward. Akash rapidly weakened over land, and advisories were discontinued on May 15.

The storm initially brought heavy rainfall to the Andaman and Nicobar Islands. Upon striking Bangladesh, Cyclonic Storm Akash produced a moderate storm tide, along with strong winds and heavy rains. The storm left dozens of boats missing, with three fisherman confirmed killed and another 50 missing. Near the coast, thousands of houses were damaged from the flooding caused by the storm. In Burma, its storm tide caused some coastal flooding. In all, 14 people were killed and damages amounted to US$982 million.

Meteorological history

During the second week of May, low pressures persisted across the Bay of Bengal. An area of convection developed on May 11, and the next day the India Meteorological Department (IMD) classified it as a depression. The system drifted northward, and initially moderate wind shear kept the deep convection on the periphery of the consolidating low-level circulation center. Gradually, banding features developed along the eastern semicircle, and with decreasing amounts of wind shear the system organized further. By May 13, the pressure had dropped to 1000 mbar as wind shear levels dropped significantly. An anticyclone developed over the system, while a mid-latitude trough over northeastern India provided favorable outflow.

Upon first being upgraded, the storm tracked steadily northward due to a break in a mid-level ridge. Akash continued to organize, with deep convection wrapping fully around the low-level circulation. As it interacted with the mid-latitude westerlies, it began to become extratropical. The storm weakened rapidly as it continued inland, and early on May 15 IMD issued its final advisory on the system; shortly thereafter, JTWC discontinued advisories. The name was contributed by India, Akash means Sky in Hindi language.

Preparations
In its daily tropical weather outlook, the India Meteorological Department warned fishermen on the Andaman and Nicobar Islands to not go into the ocean due to the anticipated rough seas. Upon approaching the coast of Bangladesh, officials canceled all flights to and from the Shah Amanat International Airport. Additionally, authorities at the port of Chittagong worked to protect cargo ships from the storm, and it was ultimately closed for a period of 19 hours. In preparation for Akash, officials advised coastal residents to evacuate further inland; about 80,000 total residents left for emergency shelters. About 40,000 Red Cross volunteers were prepared to aid those potentially affected.

Impact

The India Meteorological Department estimated winds of  affected the Andaman and Nicobar Islands, though no land reports were received.

The cyclone destroyed 205 houses and left an additional 845 damaged. Akash caused moderate crop damage near the coast, including  of destroyed lands of shrimp farms. The heavy rains, caused by outer bands of the cyclone before it made landfall, limited play in Chittagong in the third One Day International cricket match between India and Bangladesh, before the match was abandoned. Strong winds caused power outages throughout Cox's Bazar District, and downed about 200 trees on St. Martin's Island. The cyclone left a total of 10 boats unaccounted for, with about 50 fishermen missing. In total, three fisherman were confirmed killed, all on St. Martin's Island, with two people left hospitalized. The passage of Cyclone Akash left many people homeless. Initially there was no response from the government. In all, 14 people were killed by Akash and damages amounted to US$982 million.

See also

 List of tropical cyclone records
 Cyclone Mora

References

External links
 Joint Typhoon Warning Center 

2007 North Indian Ocean cyclone season
Tropical cyclones in Bangladesh
Tropical cyclones in Myanmar
2007 in Bangladesh
Cyclonic storms
Tropical cyclones in 2007